Walter "Buzz" Highsmith (August 27, 1943) is an American former gridiron football player and coach.  He played professionally in the American Football League (AFL), Canadian Football League (CFL), World Football League (WFL), and National Football League (NFL) as an offensive lineman. Highsmith served as the head football coach at Texas Southern University from 1989 to 1993, compiling a record of 19–34–2.

Highsmith started his career with the Denver Broncos of the AFL, playing 23 games in two seasons. He next played with the Montreal Alouettes for two years and 22 games, winning the Grey Cup championship in 1970. He then headed to the Houston Oilers of the NFL, playing nine games in one season. Highsmith returned to the Montreal Alouettes in 1973, playing only one game. The Memphis Southmen of the new WFL called, and he played two seasons with them. He finished his career back in the CFL with the Toronto Argonauts, playing 21 games over two years.

Highsmith has also coached at Florida A&M University and for the Toronto Argonauts.

Highsmith is the father of former NFL player Alonzo Highsmith and uncle of current former NFL player Ali Highsmith.

Head coaching record

References

External links
 
 CFLapedia profile
 World Football League Players

1943 births
Living people
American football centers
American football offensive guards
American football offensive tackles
Denver Broncos players
Florida A&M Rattlers football coaches
Florida A&M Rattlers football players
Houston Oilers players
Memphis Southmen players
Montreal Alouettes players
Toronto Argonauts coaches
Toronto Argonauts players
People from Lake Wales, Florida
Players of American football from Tampa, Florida
Players of Canadian football from Tampa, Florida
African-American coaches of American football
African-American coaches of Canadian football
African-American players of American football
African-American players of Canadian football
21st-century African-American people
20th-century African-American sportspeople